National Institute of Chemical Physics and Biophysics (NICPB; Estonian  Keemilise ja Bioloogilise Füüsika Instituut, or KBFI) is public non-profit research institute that carries out fundamental and applied research and engages in the development of the novel directions in material sciences, physics, chemistry, gene- and biotechnology, environmental technology, and computer science. in  Estonia, Tallinn at the address Akadeemia tee 23.

References

External links
 
 Keemilise ja Bioloogilise Füüsika Instituudi seadus. Riigi Teataja (RT I 1998, 101, 1664). Vastu võetud 29.10.1998

1980 establishments in the Soviet Union
1980 establishments in Estonia
Biophysics organizations
Research institutes in Estonia
Science and technology in Estonia
Research institutes in the Soviet Union